The Sam Houston Futurity is a horse race that has run since the track at Sam Houston Race Park, Houston, Texas, US, was opened in 1994. It remains one of the premier stakes races for two-year-old quarter horses in Texas. The race is currently run in mid April, during the Quarter Horse half of Sam Houston Race Park racing season.

In 2010 the distance was shortened from 400 yards to 350 yards, and again in 2011 from 350 yards to 330 yards. These changes downgraded the race from a Grade 1 to a Grade 2.

Records

Speed record:
 330 yrd. - This Is An Eagle (16.54)
 400 yrd. - Azoom (19.574)

Most wins by a jockey:
 4 - Rodrigo Vallejo (1996) (2004) (2005) (2011)

Most wins by a trainer:
 2 - Frank Cavazos (2004) (2009)
 2 - Angel Sanchez (2015) (2016)

Most wins by an owner:
 NA

Winners

References

Horse races in Texas
Sam Houston Race Park
Recurring sporting events established in 1994
1994 establishments in Texas